Robert Austin (1826 – September 1891) was a British trade unionist.

Born in Wigan, Austin joined the Journeymen Steam Engine and Machine Makers' Friendly Society in 1847.  He soon moved to Bury and helped bring about the merger which formed the Amalgamated Society of Engineers (ASE) in 1851.  In 1863, he was appointed as the Manchester Vacant Bookkeeper for the society, and became known for his honesty and devotion to duty in the post.

By 1882, Austin was the chairman of the Manchester and Salford Trades Council and, in the post, was centrally involved in organising that year's Trades Union Congress (TUC).  He was chosen unanimously as President of the TUC that year.

In 1886, Austin was elected as general secretary of the ASE, defeating John Anderson by 9,956 votes to 9,100.  He took up office the following year, and served in the post until his death in 1891.

References

1826 births
1891 deaths
Trade unionists from the Metropolitan Borough of Wigan
General Secretaries of the Amalgamated Engineering Union
People from Wigan
Presidents of the Trades Union Congress
19th-century British businesspeople